Christ Church is an Anglican church in Wesham, a small town in the English county of Lancashire. It is an active parish church in the Diocese of Blackburn and the archdeaconry of Lancaster. It was built 1893–94 by Paley, Austin and Paley, and is recorded in the National Heritage List for England as a designated Grade II listed building.

History and administration
Building of the church started in 1893–94, but at this time the east end was not included. The church was designed by the Lancaster-based architecture firm of Paley, Austin and Paley. The church provided seating for 229 people, and cost £3,350 (equivalent to £ in ).  In 1927–28, the east end was completed, a south porch was added, and the nave was reseated, increasing the seating to 317. This was carried out by Henry Paley, trading as Austin and Paley, and cost £5,650.

The church was used as a chapel-of-ease to Kirkham until 1913, when it was made a separate parish. The foundation stone was laid on 30 June 1892, by the Lady E. C. Clifton, and the church was consecrated by Bishop Moorhouse on 27 September 1894.

On 11 June 1986, Christ Church was designated a Grade II listed building by English Heritage. The Grade II designation—the third highest of the three grades—is for buildings that are "nationally important and of special interest". An active church in the Church of England, Christ Church is part of the diocese of Blackburn, which is in the Province of York. It is in the archdeaconry of Lancaster and the Deanery of Kirkham. It forms a benefice with Christ Church, Treales.

2013 saw a concert by British Christian singer-songwriter and worship leader Graham Kendrick.

Architecture
Christ Church is in the Decorated Perpendicular style and is constructed of red brick with dressings in red terracotta. The roof is red tile. The church plan consists of a nave and chancel under one roof, with a steeple to the south-west. The tower is of three stages and has a stepped sandstone parapet; the steeple is clad in green slate.

The nave has six bays and internally there are stone piers. The chancel has a large east window with mouchette tracery.

External features
The churchyard contains the war graves of two soldiers of World War I, and four soldiers and a Royal Navy chaplain of World War II. There is also a memorial to the paupers of the Wesham Workhouse.

See also

Listed buildings in Medlar-with-Wesham
List of works by Paley, Austin and Paley
List of ecclesiastical works by Austin and Paley (1916–44)

References
Citations

Sources

External links

"Christ Church Wesham" at wesham.org.uk

Christ Church, Wesham
Church of England church buildings in Lancashire
Diocese of Blackburn
Grade II listed churches in Lancashire
Paley, Austin and Paley buildings